Connecticut Connection is a high-rise building located at 1101 Connecticut Avenue NW in the United States capital of Washington, D.C. The building stands at a height of  and has 12 stories. Construction of the building was completed in 1978. The architect of the building was Skidmore, Owings & Merrill, who created the postmodern design  and aesthetic of the building.

See also
List of tallest buildings in Washington, D.C.

References

Skyscraper office buildings in Washington, D.C.
Skidmore, Owings & Merrill buildings
Office buildings completed in 1978
1978 establishments in Washington, D.C.